The Dubrovnik subdialect is a subdialect of the Shtokavian dialect of Serbo-Croatian. It is spoken in the area of Dubrovnik and the littoral of the former Republic of Ragusa, from Janjina on the Pelješac peninsula to the Croatian border with Montenegro, island of Mljet.

It is the least widespread of the Serbo-Croatian subdialects in Croatia. It has Ijekavian accent, with a sporadic presence of Ikavisms. Unlike main Eastern Herzegovinian dialect which is part of Eastern Shtokavian, the Dubrovnikan subdialect was Western Shtokavian, and shared some common features including Ikavisms with other Western Shtokavian subdialects. It was, basically, a transitional dialect between Western Shtokavian, Eastern Shtokavian and Chakavian dialect. Neoshtokavisation gave similar results in Dubrovnik as in East Herzegovina, but starting points were different for both, and its Ijekavian accent does not originate from East Herzegovina because lacks yat reflexes like in other dialects (most similar to Eastern Bosnian dialect). This subdialect was once independent Western Shtokavian subdialect, but after migrations and Neoshtokavisation, it can be considered as part of Ijekavian Neoshtokavian East Herzegovina(-Krajina) dialect, but representing a specific idiom. Some features are still different, like accent, vowels, morphology and so on.

The majority of loanwords come from the Ragusan dialect of the Dalmatian language and from Italian (Florentine and Venetian dialects). Lexicon also has some similarities with Chakavian, and does not have many Turkish loanwords.

During the time of the Republic of Ragusa the subdialect was called the Ragusan language ("dubrovački jezik") by both native speakers and foreigners, e.g.  (Ragusan author from 1617),  (Bartol Kašić, non-Ragusan author, from 1638).

In California (Watsonville), Croatian emigration preserved well local speech type of Konavle.

See also
 Croatian language
 Serbian language

References

External links 
Vijenac Josip Lisac: Dubrovnik i hrvatska tradicija 

Croatian language
Dubrovnik-Neretva County
Dialects of Serbo-Croatian